Junior Davis Cup and Junior Billie Jean King Cup are the international team events in junior tennis (16-and-under age category).

History
Competitions were launched by the ITF in 1985 as the 16-and-under World Youth Cup, and rebranded in 2002 under the current names.

Format: Each year nations enter regional qualifying events with the winners progressing to the Finals, where they compete to be crowned champion.

The senior equivalents of the Junior Davis Cup and Junior Billie Jean King Cup are the Davis Cup and Billie Jean King Cup, respectively.

Winners

Junior Davis Cup

Junior Billie Jean King Cup

Medals (1985–2022)

Junior Davis Cup

  include  /  include

Junior Billie Jean King Cup

  include  /  include  /  include

See also

 Davis Cup
 Fed Cup
 ATP Cup
 World Team Cup
 :es:Copa Mundial de Tenis Juvenil (U14)
 :es:Campeonato Sudamericano de Tenis (U12/U14/U16)
 :es:Copa Davis Juvenil
 :es:Copa Fed Juvenil

References

External links
History of Junior Davis and Fed Cup
Results of Junior Davis and Fed Cup

 
Junior tennis
Davis Cup
Billie Jean King Cup
Tennis tournaments
Recurring sporting events established in 1985